The Miracle of the Desecrated Host is a six-panel tempera-on-panel predella by Paolo Uccello, painted between 1467 and 1469 for the Confraternity of the Corpus Domini and their oratory in the Corpus Domini church in Urbino. The predella was completed before van Wassenhove's work and Uccello received his last payment on 17 October 1469 (folio 37v) and the rules made by folio 38r (a total of 18 florins and 16 bolognini).

Uccello had also originally been commissioned to paint the altarpiece to which this predella would be attached, but that work was instead entrusted to Justus van Gent, who completed the main altarpiece Communion of the Apostles in 1474.

Measuring 42 cm by 361 cm, the predella was moved to Santa Agatha then to the Scolopi College. It was then lost until 1858, when it was rediscovered in a barn and moved to the Ducal Palace. It had probably been used as a masons' bench and had been damaged, with the colours altered by traces of lime. It was restored in 1954, revealing previous repainting and repairs. It is now in the Galleria Nazionale delle Marche in Urbino.

Description
It shows a story of host desecration, possibly inspired by Bernardino of Siena's sermons, running from left to right and with each scene separated from the next by separately-painted half-balustrades. From left to right these show
 a woman exchanges a host with a Jewish merchant for a mantle or a Jewish usurer for money
 the Jew tries to burn the host, but it starts to bleed, alerting the guards
 a procession is organised to re-consecrate the host
 despite repenting, the woman is going to be hanged at the tree, however an angel descends from heaven to save her soul
 the Jew and his family are burned at the stake
 two angels and two devils argue over the woman's body

References

Bibliography
  Franco Borsi and Stefano Borsi, Paolo Uccello, p. 260
  Jean-Louis Schefer, L’Hostie profanée - histoire d’une fiction théologique, Éditions P.O.L, 2007, 
  Camille Salatko Petryszcze, mémoire de Master, Le Mistere de la Saincte Hostie
  Introductory summary to the work of Jean-Louis Schefer

Paintings by Paolo Uccello
Collections of the Galleria Nazionale delle Marche
1460s paintings
Antisemitism in Italy
Christian antisemitism in the Middle Ages
Antisemitic works
Rediscovered works